Fedcap Rehabilitation Services, Inc., or Fedcap, is a Manhattan-based non-profit organization that provides vocational training and employment resources to those who face problems with  disabilities and employment-related problems.

Originally established in 1935 as the Federation of Crippled and Disabled, it then became the Federation of the Handicapped in 1946, ultimately switching to its current name in 1992. It was one of the first vocational rehabilitation programs for the handicapped established in the United States.

Services
Fedcap's programs and services are free of charge for the trainees and last for three to six months. Fedcap’s approach includes thorough vocational evaluations to help determine appropriate career paths for clients followed by vocational training in a variety of fields including custodial, culinary arts, data entry/document imaging, office skills, hospitality, and mailroom/messenger services. Fedcap’s New York State licensed business and trade school offers small classes and individualized attention from highly qualified instructors.

After graduation, all clients receive career counseling, job placement services, and ongoing on-the-job support. Fedcap graduates obtain jobs at private companies or with Fedcap in New York, New Jersey, and Washington, D.C. The majority of the jobs FEDCAP is able to offer are made possible through the New York State Preferred Source Program, New Jersey ACCSES, and the federal AbilityOne Program.

Fedcap also operates a licensed home health care agency; Chelton Loft, a clubhouse for adults with severe and persistent mental illness; a Partial Care Mental Health Program for adults with developmental disabilities and mental illness; a Youth Program for young adults transitioning into the workforce; and a Veterans Program assisting returning veterans with their transition to civilian life.

Controversy
On February 14, 2020, the Progressive Conservative government of the province of Ontario in Canada announced that as part of its plan to reform government employment services accessed by Ontarians, three prototype regions would be overseen by a Service System Manager to identify efficiencies and ways to increase labour market responsiveness. The Service System Manager for the Hamilton-Niagara region would be a consortium led by FedCap Inc., an American human-resources firm based out of New York City.

Ontario's official opposition New Democratic Party (NDP) called the plan a "recipe for disaster". It expressed concern that paying service managers based on job matching results would erode social services; that contractors could refuse to serve more challenging cases, press people into poor-fitting job placements, or force them back to work prematurely.

The NDP said similar privatization plans in the United Kingdom and Australia have not worked out, citing Australia’s privatized JobActive system which was described in an Australian Senate report as a “bureaucratic nightmare” that would need to be overhauled.

Ministers of Provincial Parliament (MPPs) in the Hamilton-Niagara region expressed concern at the Conservative government’s push to privatize public services, its insufficient consultation with stakeholders, and the resulting uncertainty for local employment service providers.

Awards
Rehabilitation Program of Distinction, from the National Rehabilitation Association
National Award for Community Outreach, from the NISH National Conference in Hollywood

References

Further reading
A Proud Record of Aid; Federation of Handicapped Starts 25th Year With 2 Forward-Looking Projects, The New York Times

Non-profit organizations based in New York City
Disability organizations based in the United States
Vocational education
Organizations established in 1935
1935 establishments in New York (state)
Organizations based in Manhattan
Vocational rehabilitation